Barbara Alyn Woods (born ) is an American actress. She is known for her roles in television series One Tree Hill and Honey, I Shrunk the Kids. She is the mother of actresses Natalie Alyn Lind, Emily Alyn Lind, and Alyvia Alyn Lind.

Career
Woods has acted professionally since 1988. She is known for portraying Deborah "Deb" Scott on the WB/CW teen drama series One Tree Hill. She starred in the show from 2003 to 2009 and appeared on the final season in 2012. She started out recurring in season 1 and was upgraded to full series regular status in November sweeps. Due to the format change of the show she only appeared in four episodes of season 5 but returned as a series regular in season 6.

Woods played the lead role in the 1993 USA Network prime-time soap opera Eden, which was canceled after 26 episodes. Woods posed nude for the June 1993 issue of Playboy as part of a promotion for the television series Eden. She is also known for the role as Diane Szalinski on Honey, I Shrunk the Kids: The TV Show which ran from 1997 to 2000.

In the early 1990s, Woods starred in several films such as Circuitry Man (1990), The Terror Within II (1991), Delusion (1991), The Waterdance (1992), Flesh and Bone (1993), Ghoulies IV (1994) and Frankie Starlight (1995). She also appeared in Demi Moore's film Striptease in 1996.

Woods also has appeared in guest roles on numerous television series, including Star Trek: The Next Generation, Married... with Children, The Golden Girls, Picket Fences, Seinfeld, Murder, She Wrote, Touched by an Angel, Dream On, Desperate Housewives and was recurring on ABC's The Gates in 2010.

Personal life
Woods attended Hinsdale South High School in Darien, Illinois and Northern Illinois University. She is married to John Lind (an assistant director), whom she met on the set of Honey, I Shrunk the Kids: The TV Show. They were married in 1999. They have three daughters, Natalie, Emily and Alyvia, who are all film and television actresses.

Filmography

Film

Television

References

External links

1965 births
Living people
Actresses from Chicago
People from Darien, Illinois
American film actresses
American television actresses
Northern Illinois University alumni
20th-century American actresses
21st-century American actresses